The 2016–17 Duke Blue Devils men's basketball team represented Duke University during the 2016–17 NCAA Division I men's basketball season. They were coached by a 37th-year head coach, Mike Krzyzewski. Starting on January 7, Jeff Capel temporarily took over coaching duties while Krzyzewski recovered from lower back surgery. The Blue Devils played their home games at Cameron Indoor Stadium in Durham, North Carolina as a member of the Atlantic Coast Conference. They finished the season 28–9, 11–7 in ACC play to finish in fifth place. They became the first ACC team to win four games in four days on their way to winning the ACC tournament. They received the ACC's automatic bid to the NCAA tournament where they defeated Troy in the first round to advance to the second round where they lost to South Carolina.

Previous season

Duke advanced to the Sweet Sixteen a year after winning its fifth national championship. The Blue Devils beat UNC-Wilmington and Yale before falling to top seeded Oregon in the West region.

Off-season

Departures

2016 recruiting class

Future recruits

2017–18 team recruits

Roster

 

Roster is subject to change as/if players transfer or leave the program for other reasons.

Schedule and results 

|-
!colspan=12 style=| Exhibition

|-
!colspan=12 style=| Non-conference regular season

|-
!colspan=12 style=| ACC regular season

|-
!colspan=12 style=| ACC Tournament

|-
!colspan=12 style=| NCAA tournament

Rankings

*AP does not release post-NCAA Tournament rankings

Notes

References

Duke Blue Devils
Duke Blue Devils men's basketball seasons
Duke
2016 in sports in North Carolina
2017 in sports in North Carolina